Don Fernando Palaiologos or Paleologo was a 15th and 16th-century nobleman of Greek descent who lived in Italy. After the death of Andreas Palaiologos in 1502, Fernando claimed the title of Despot of the Morea. Though Andreas Palaiologos is generally believed to have been childless, Fernando might have been his son, though possibly illegitimate, and through Andreas possibly a grandnephew of Constantine XI Palaiologos, the final Byzantine emperor.

There are early 16th century references to a Despot of the Morea commanding a cavalry unit, and fathering a son by the name Giovanni Martino Leonardo, but it is not clear whether these are references to Fernando, given the existence of a contemporary rival claimant to the title, Constantine Arianiti.

Biography 
Fernando is first attested on 17 July 1499, when the Duke of Milan, Ludovico Sforza, reported that he had sent "Don Fernando, son of the Despot of the Morea, nephew of the lord Constantine [Arianiti, governor of Montferrat], to the Turk with five horses". This appears to have been a diplomatic, or possible espionage, mission. The only claimant to the title of Despot of the Morea at this time was Andreas Palaiologos. Although Andreas is commonly believed not to have left any children, it is thus possible that Fernando was Andreas's son. The historian Jonathan Harris believes that it is possible that Fernando was Andreas's illegitimate son.

After Andreas Palaiologos died in June 1502, Fernando adopted the title of Despot of the Morea. Fernando's life is obscure and he appears to have made relatively little impact on history. Why is not clear, but it is possible that he was hampered somehow, perhaps explainable if he was illegitimate. Alternatively, he way simply have been unwilling to play a more prominent role. After Andreas's death, the genealogically unconnected Constantine Arianiti, referenced in Sforza's 1499 report, also claimed the title of Despot of the Morea. A letter from Antonio Giustiniani, Venetian ambassador to the Pope, mentions an unnamed 'despot' in command of a cavalry unit in October 1502, though Jonathan Harris believes that this might be a reference to Constantine Arianiti rather than Fernando.

One of Andreas's successors as claimant to the position of despot, the name of whom is not mentioned in the sources, raised problems of protocol when he in 1518 invited Pope Leo X to become the godparent of his son Giovanni Martino Leonardo (Joannes Martinus Leonhardus as written in Latin) and also invited ten cardinals to the baptism. According to the contemporary Papal master of ceremonies, Paris de Grassis, the honors asked for was as if the despot believed himself to be 'baptizing the Emperor of Christendom himself'. Kenneth Setton, writing in 1962, believed this despot to be Constantine Arianiti, a sentiment also held by Christian Gottfried Hoffmann, who included Paris de Grassis's account of the affair in his work Nova scriptorum ac monumentorum partim rarissimorum partim ineditorum, a collection of historical texts, in 1731. Identification with Constantine is problematic however, given that contemporary sources otherwise hold that Constantine only had a single son, named Arianitto. Jonathan Harris believes that this 1518 despot could instead be Fernando.

Notes

References

Bibliography 

 
 
 

Fernando
Greek Roman Catholics
Byzantine pretenders after 1453